Elma G. Albert (June 5, 1866 – February 19, 1942) was a justice of the Iowa Supreme Court from January 1, 1925, to December 21, 1936, appointed from Greene County, Iowa.

References

External links

Justices of the Iowa Supreme Court
1866 births
1942 deaths